Illuminati is an EP released in 2002 by Fatboy Slim.

The EP's title track is a re-make of a previous Fatboy Slim song entitled "Michael Jackson," which is featured on the US edition of Better Living Through Chemistry and was the B-side to the "Going Out of My Head" single. Bootsy Collins from Parliament/Funkadelic provides the vocals to the song. It was featured in the movie Lara Croft: Tomb Raider and is a long-running theme song for the WEC.

The EP was the first in a series of EPs released by Fatboy Slim.

Track listing
 "Illuminati" (Collins, Cook) - 4:18 (Feat. Bootsy Collins)
 "Star 69" (Timo Maas Mix) (Clark, Cook, McCormack) - 6:32
 "Song for Shelter" (Pete Heller Extended) (Clark, Slim) - 9:58
 "Drop the Hate" (Laid Mix) (Cook, Daniels) - 7:19
 "Sunset (Bird of Prey)" (Darren Emerson Mix) (Cook, Densmore, Kreiger) - 9:25
 "Demons" (Stanton Warriors Mix) (Cook, Gray, Jackson, Withers) - 6:08

External links 

 Rolling Stone review

2002 EPs
Fatboy Slim EPs